Ectoedemia euphorbiella is a moth of the  family Nepticulidae. It is found in southern Europe. It is confined to the warmest parts of Europe and has a very localised distribution. It is always found close to the sea.

Adults are very variable in size and colour, probably depending on leaf size.

The larvae feed on Euphorbia acanthothamnos, Euphorbia brittingeri, Euphorbia characias, Euphorbia dendroides, Euphorbia fragifera, Euphorbia myrsinites, Euphorbia palustris, Euphorbia rigida, Euphorbia serrata and Euphorbia terracina. They mine the leaves of their host plant. The mine consists of a long, strongly tortuous corridor, widening into an elongate blotch. Pupation takes place outside of the mine.

External links
Fauna Europaea
bladmineerders.nl

Nepticulidae
Moths of Europe